The 46th Pennsylvania House of Representatives District is in southwest Pennsylvania and has been represented by Jason Ortitay since 2015.

District Profile
The 46th Pennsylvania House of Representatives District is located in Allegheny County and Washington County and includes the following areas:

Allegheny County

 McDonald (Allegheny County Portion)
 Oakdale
 South Fayette Township 

Washington County

Canonsburg
 Cecil Township
Chartiers Township
Houston
 McDonald (Washington County Portion)
 Mount Pleasant Township
North Strabane Township (part)
District 06
District 07
District 08
District 09

Representatives

Recent election results

References

Government of Allegheny County, Pennsylvania
Government of Washington County, Pennsylvania
46

External links
District map from the United States Census Bureau
Pennsylvania House Legislative District Maps from the Pennsylvania Redistricting Commission.  
Population Data for District 46 from the Pennsylvania Redistricting Commission.